Black Point Airport  is a public use airport located near Black Point, the Bahamas.

Airlines and destinations

See also
List of airports in the Bahamas

References

External links 
 Airport record for Black Point Airport at Landings.com

Airports in the Bahamas